The 1969 ECAC Hockey Men's Ice Hockey Tournament was the 8th tournament in league history. It was played between March 4 and March 8, 1969. Quarterfinal games were played at home team campus sites, while the 'final four' games were played at the Boston Garden in Boston, Massachusetts. By reaching the championship game both, Cornell and Harvard received invitations to participate in the 1969 NCAA University Division Men's Ice Hockey Tournament.

Format
The tournament featured three rounds of play, all of which were single-elimination. The top eight teams, based on conference rankings, qualified to participate in the tournament. In the quarterfinals the first seed and eighth seed, the second seed and seventh seed, the third seed and sixth seed and the fourth seed and fifth seed played against one another. In the semifinals, the winner of the first and eighth matchup played the winner of the fourth and fifth matchup while the other two remaining teams played with the winners advancing to the championship game and the losers advancing to the third place game.

Conference standings

Note: GP = Games played; W = Wins; L = Losses; T = Ties; Pct. = Winning percentage; GF = Goals for; GA = Goals against

Bracket

Note: * denotes overtime period(s)

Quarterfinals

(1) Cornell vs. (8) St. Lawrence

(2) Harvard vs. (7) New Hampshire

(3) Boston College vs. (6) Clarkson

(4) Boston University vs. (5) Rensselaer

Semifinals

(1) Cornell vs. (4) Boston University

(2) Harvard vs. (6) Clarkson

Third Place

(4) Boston University vs. (6) Clarkson

Championship

(1) Cornell vs. (2) Harvard

Tournament awards

All-Tournament Team

First Team
F Joe Cavanagh (Harvard)
F Brian Cornell (Cornell)
F Herb Wakabayashi (Boston University)
D Chris Gurry (Harvard)
D Bruce Pattison (Cornell)
G Ken Dryden* (Cornell)
* Most Outstanding Player(s)

Second Team
F Tom Deacon (Clarkson)
F Eddie Wright (Boston University)
F Kevin Pettit (Cornell)
D Bill Hinch (Boston University)
D Terry Flaman (Harvard)
G Jim McCann (Boston University)

References

External links
ECAC Hockey
1968–69 ECAC Hockey Standings
1968–69 NCAA Standings

ECAC Hockey Men's Ice Hockey Tournament
ECAC tournament